Arsenije Zlatanović (born 4 December 1989) is a Serbian inactive tennis player.

Zlatanović has a career high ATP singles ranking of 609 achieved on 30 April 2012. He also has a career high ATP doubles ranking of 690 achieved on 23 August 2010.

Zlatanović made his ATP main draw debut at the 2009 Serbia Open. He was defeated by Łukasz Kubot in the first round.

ATP Challenger Tour and ITF Futures finals

Singles: 1 (0–1)

Doubles: 7 (2–5)

External links

1989 births
Living people
Serbian male tennis players
Tennis players from Belgrade